Hope Rising is Fee's second major label studio album, released on October 6, 2009 through INO Records. Their song "Glory to God Forever" is the lead single from this album, peaking at No. 22 on Billboards Christian Songs chart.

Track listing

Chart positions

Fee (band) albums
2009 albums